Monsignor Renard was a four-part ITV television drama set in occupied France during World War II. It starred John Thaw as Monsignor Augustin Renard, a French priest who is drawn into the Resistance movement. The series was later shown in the U.S. as part of Masterpiece Theatre.

Plot
In 1940, Monsignor Renard arrives back in his hometown 20 years after leaving to become a Catholic priest. The village is filled with reminders of his former life, including Madeleine, his one time fiancée who has never forgiven him for choosing the church over her. The village is also occupied by Nazis preparing to invade England using the town as an embarkation point. Against this Renard performs his Ministry while being drawn ever deeper into the resistance movement.

References

External links

Episode guide

World War II television drama series
2000 British television series debuts
2000 British television series endings
2000s British drama television series
ITV television dramas
2000s British television miniseries
Carlton Television
Television series by ITV Studios
English-language television shows